The Workplace Gender Equality Agency (WGEA) is an Australian Government statutory agency responsible for promoting and improving gender equality in Australian workplaces. The agency was created by the Workplace Gender Equality Act 2012 and provides employers with advice, practical tools, and education to help them improve gender equality. The Workplace Gender Equality Act 2012 was enacted by an amendment to the Equal Opportunity for Women in the Workplace Act 1999, that changed its name to the Workplace Gender Equality Act and correspondingly changed the name of the Equality Opportunity for Women in the Workplace Agency to the Workplace Gender Equality Agency. The Workplace Gender Equality Agency is part of the Department of the Prime Minister and Cabinet.

Activities 
Non-public sector employers with 100 or more staff are required to report to the agency annually, between 1 April-31 May, against six gender equality indicators:
 Gender composition of the workforce
 Gender composition of governing bodies of relevant employers
 Equal remuneration between women and men
 Availability and utility of employment terms, conditions and practices relating to flexible working arrangements for employees and to working arrangements supporting employees with family or caring responsibilities
 Consultation with employees on issues concerning gender equality in the workplace
 Any other matters specified by the Minister: sex-based harassment and discrimination

The Agency uses the data to develop confidential and customised Competitor Analysis Benchmark Reports for employers, that allow them to compare their performance to their peers.

The WGEA dataset is unique, covering 4 million employees or around 40% of the Australian workforce, providing a detailed insight into the state of gender equality in Australian workplaces, and at an industry and sector level.

The WGEA's data is publicly available and searchable at https://data.wgea.gov.au

Key statistics 
The following statistics were sourced from WGEA's 2017-18 dataset: https://www.wgea.gov.au/data/wgea-research/australias-gender-equality-scorecard
 Australia's gender pay gap is 21.3% based on full-time total remuneration, and 16.2% based on full-time base remuneration. 
 17.1% of CEOs are women
 30.5% of Key Management Personnel positions held by women
 39.1% of managers are women
 6.4% of management positions are part-time
 70.7% of employers have a flexible working policy or strategy
 74.3% have an overall gender equality strategy and/or policy
 46.9% of employers have a domestic violence policy or strategy

Agency director 
Mary Wooldridge was announced as the new director of the Workplace Gender Equality Agency in April 2021.

Before joining the Agency, Wooldridge served from 2006 to 2020 in the Victorian Parliament, including a term as Minister for Mental Health, Community Services, and Women’s Affairs.

As minister, Wooldridge worked to implement the National Plan to Reduce Violence against Women and their Children 2010-2022 and was instrumental in establishing Our Watch, the national family violence prevention agency. She was the Minister responsible for signing Victoria up to the National Disability Insurance Scheme (NDIS). She established the Victorian Commission for Children and Young People, including the nation’s first Aboriginal Commissioner, Parkville College – an award-winning Public School in Youth Justice Centres, and Australia’s first Mental Health Complaints Commissioner and the Family Drug Treatment Court.

Prior to being elected to Parliament, Wooldridge was the CEO of The Foundation for Young Australians and worked with McKinsey & Company and Consolidated Press Holdings.

References

External links
 Workplace Gender Equality Agency
 About the WGEA (wgea.gov.au) Retrieved August 22, 2013
 The Workplace Gender Equality Act 2012 (comlaw)

2012 establishments in Australia
Commonwealth Government agencies of Australia
Government agencies established in 2012